Moussa Guindo (born 25 January 1991) is a retired Ivorian-Malian footballer who played as a defender.

Club career 
Born in Adjamé, Ivory Coast, Guindo began his career by Académie de Sol Beni, Guindo was promoted 2008 and was one of ASEC Mimosas's youngest players but a regular in defence as he enjoyed a first choice berth under coach Patrick Liewig. In January 2009 he joined Charlton Athletic. and returned to ASEC Mimosas on loan in July 2009. He moved to the land of his forefathers, Mali, and signed with Stade Malien.

In 2012, he joined the Tunisian League club CA Bizertin.

International career 
Guindo represented the Under-20 national team from Mali at 2009 African Youth Championship in Rwanda, and was member of the U-17 at CAN 2006, lastly the 2011 FIFA U-20 World Cup.

References

1991 births
Living people
Footballers from Abidjan
Ivorian people of Malian descent
Malian footballers
Association football defenders
Association football midfielders
ASEC Mimosas players
Stade Malien players
CA Bizertin players
Mali under-20 international footballers
Malian expatriate footballers
Expatriate footballers in England
Malian expatriate sportspeople in England
Expatriate footballers in Tunisia
Malian expatriate sportspeople in Tunisia
Tunisian Ligue Professionnelle 1 players